Pisidium artifex is a species of freshwater clam in the family Sphaeriidae. It is endemic to Kenya, where it is known only from Mount Kenya. It lives in water bodies at an elevation of 4,300 metres.

References

Endemic molluscs of Kenya
artifex

Molluscs described in 1960
Taxonomy articles created by Polbot